This page lists board and card games, wargames, miniatures games, and tabletop role-playing games published in 1978. For video games, see 1978 in video gaming.

Games released or invented in 1978

See also 
 1978 in video gaming

Games
Games by year